Pointe Bayeux is a mountain of Haute-Savoie, France. It lies in the Mont Blanc Massif range. It has an altitude of  4258 metres above sea level.

Mountains of the Alps
Mountains of Haute-Savoie